Purna is a town in Parbhani district in the Indian state of Maharashtra.

Purna may also refer to:

 Purna River (tributary of Godavari), a river of Maharashtra, India
 Purna River (tributary of Tapti), a river of Maharashtra, India
 Purna Dam, an earthfill dam on the Purna River near Amravati District, Maharashtra
 Punna or Pūrṇa Maitrāyanīputra, Buddhist arhat (awakened being) and one of the principal disciples of the Buddha

See also
 
 Poorna (disambiguation)